Anomobryum is a genus of mosses belonging to the family Bryaceae.

The genus was first described by Wilhelm Philippe Schimper.

The genus has cosmopolitan distribution.

Species:

Anomobryum albo-imbricatum T. Koponen & Norris, 1984
Anomobryum alpinum Zang Mu & Li Xing-jiang, 1985
Anomobryum angustirete Brotherus 1927
Anomobryum astorense Brotherus 1903
Anomobryum auratum Jaeger 1875
Anomobryum brachymenioides Dixon & Potier de la Varde 1930
Anomobryum brachymeniopsis Brotherus 1903
Anomobryum bulbiferum E. B. Bartram 1942
Anomobryum bullatum (C. Müller) Brotherus 1903
Anomobryum clavicaule Brotherus 1903
Anomobryum compressulum Brotherus 1903
Anomobryum conicum Brotherus 1903
Anomobryum cygnicollum Jaeger 1875
Anomobryum drakensbergense Rooy 1986
Anomobryum erectum B. C. Tan & T. Koponen 1989
Anomobryum filinerve Brotherus 1903
Anomobryum gemmigerum Brotherus 1910
Anomobryum harriottii Dixon 1926
Anomobryum humillimum Brotherus 1903
Anomobryum hyalinum T. Koponen & Norris 1984
Anomobryum julaceum W. P. Schimper 1860
Anomobryum kashmirense Brotherus 1903
Anomobryum laceratum Brotherus 1903
Anomobryum lanatum Spence & H.P.Ramsay, 2002
Anomobryum leptostomoides W. P. Schimper 1873
Anomobryum lusitanicum Thériot 1933
Anomobryum marginatum Dixon & Badhwar 1938
Anomobryum minutirete Kis 1984
Anomobryum nidificans Coppey 1911
Anomobryum obtusatissimum Brotherus 1903
Anomobryum ochianum A. J. Shaw ex A. J. Shaw & Fife 1984
Anomobryum ochii T. Koponen & Norris 1984
Anomobryum parvifolium E. B. Bartram 1961
Anomobryum pellucidum Dixon & Badhwar 1938
Anomobryum polymorphum Dixon 1938
Anomobryum polysetum A. J. Shaw 1986
Anomobryum prostratum Bescherelle 1872
Anomobryum pycnobaseum Brotherus 1903
Anomobryum schmidii Jaeger 1875
Anomobryum semiovatum Jaeger 1875
Anomobryum semireticulatum Brotherus 1903
Anomobryum sharpii A. J. Shaw ex A. J. Shaw & Fife 1984
Anomobryum soquense Brotherus 1903
Anomobryum steerei A. J. Shaw 1987
Anomobryum subnitidum Cardot & Potier de la Varde 1923
Anomobryum subrotundifolium Spence & H. P. Ramsay 2002
Anomobryum tereticaule A. J. Shaw ex A. J. Shaw & Fife 1984
Anomobryum werthii Brotherus ex Drygalski 1906
Anomobryum worthleyi H. Robinson 1967
Anomobryum yasudae Brotherus 1921

References

Bryaceae
Moss genera